Pedro Henrique Martins Cassia (born November 1, 1985 in Orindiúva) is a Brazilian footballer.

Pedro began his career in 2007 with Paulista, and soon was loaned to several clubs, such as Lausanne Sports, Fortaleza and Santa Cruz.

He transferred to Bragantino in July 2009. Soon after he transferred to Rio Claro in January 2010, Pedro decided to make another move. He joined Jiangsu Sainty in February. And after one season with the club he joined Volta Redonda in Brazilian Série D. On 26 July 2011 he joined the Swedish club Kalmar FF.

References

1985 births
Living people
Brazilian footballers
Brazilian expatriate footballers
Allsvenskan players
Swiss Challenge League players
Chinese Super League players
Paulista Futebol Clube players
FC Lausanne-Sport players
Fortaleza Esporte Clube players
Santa Cruz Futebol Clube players
Clube Atlético Bragantino players
Rio Claro Futebol Clube players
Jiangsu F.C. players
Guaratinguetá Futebol players
Volta Redonda FC players
Expatriate footballers in Switzerland
Brazilian expatriate sportspeople in Switzerland
Expatriate footballers in China
Brazilian expatriate sportspeople in China
Expatriate footballers in Sweden
Association football forwards